American singer Janelle Monáe has released three studio albums, four extended plays, twenty singles and eighteen music videos. Monáe debuted with an EP, Metropolis: Suite I (The Chase), which had a modest commercial impact, peaking at number 115 on the Billboard charts in the United States. In 2010, Monáe released her debut studio album, The ArchAndroid, through Bad Boy Records; it is a concept album sequel to her first EP. The album was nominated at the 53rd Grammy Awards for Best Contemporary R&B Album and peaked the number 17 on the Billboard 200. In March 2012, "We Are Young", a song by the band fun. on which Monáe makes a guest appearance, reached the top of the Billboard Hot 100, her first appearance in the chart. Monáe released her second album, The Electric Lady, on September 10, 2013, peaking at number five on the Billboard 200 and producing four singles. Her third album, Dirty Computer, was released on April 27, 2018. In December 2018, the album received a Grammy Award nomination for Album of the Year.

Studio albums

Demos

Extended plays

Singles

As lead artist

As featured artist

Promotional singles

Other charted songs

Guest appearances
The following songs are not singles or promotional singles and have not appeared on an album by Janelle Monáe.

Songwriting credits

Music videos

Notes

References

External links
 
 

Discographies of American artists
Rhythm and blues discographies
Soul music discographies